This list of works from José Martínez Ruiz, also authored under his pseudonym Azorín, catalogues the Spanish author's major published works. In addition to being a novelist, Martínez was a novelist, essayist, literary critic, and to a lesser extent, a political radical. Much of his portfolio of work centered on the societal value of Spanish culture. During the Spanish Civil War, 1936 to 1939, Martínez wrote newspaper articles in Argentina La Nación, later resuming novel-writing in Madrid in 1943.

List 
Published under the pseudonym Azorín, unless otherwise indicated:

See also 

 List of essayists
 List of Spanish-language authors

References

Further reading 

Spanish novelists
Spanish literature
Spanish poems
Literature about poetry
Poetry anthologies